Nacke may refer to:

People
 Bernd Nacke (1921–2011) German racing driver
 Frances Nacke Noel (1873–1963) suffragette
 Heinz Nacke, Luftwaffe Hauptmann who received the Knight's Cross to the Iron Cross in 1940
 Lou Nacke (1959–2001), a passenger who attempted to retake United 93 on September 11, 2001
 Paul Näcke (1851–1913), German psychiatrist and criminologist
 Rudolf Nacke, Luftwaffe Stabsfeldwebel who received the Knight's Cross to the Iron Cross in 1941

Other uses
 Nacke (1901–1913), defunct German car company, see List of automobile manufacturers of Germany
 nacke, a word in Swenglish

See also

 
 Knacke (disambiguation)
 Knake (disambiguation)
 Nake (disambiguation)

Human name disambiguation pages